KRT77 encodes keratin 77, a member of the type II keratin family of intermediate filament proteins. Keratin 77 is also known as KRT1B, Type II cytoskeletal 1b, Type II keratin Kb39, and cytokeratin 1B. KRT77 is well-expressed by granular layer epidermal keratinocytes except for those that reside at acral surfaces. There is little to no expression of KRT77 in acral keratinocytes.

References